Hassi Messaoud Oil Field is an oil field located in Ouargla Province. It was discovered in 1956 by S.N. REPAL and developed by Sonatrach. The oil field is operated and owned by Sonatrach.

References 

Oil fields in Algeria